Khalil Allah I, known in Nizari Isma'ili tradition by the Sufi name Dhu'l-Faqar Ali, was the 37th imam of the Qasim-Shahi branch of Nizari Isma'ilism.

Khalil Allah succeeded his father Murad Mirza when the latter died in 1574. Like his father, he resided and was buried at Anjudan in central Persia, where his tombstone survives to this day. The tombstone gives the date of his death as March 1634.

Khalil Allah had close relations with the ruling Safavid dynasty. He married a princes, possibly a daughter of Shah Abbas I, and in 1627, the Savafid ruler issued an edict exempting the Shi'a of Anjudan from certain taxes. As Farhad Daftary points out, the edict refers to the Anjudani Shi'a as Twelvers, indicating that Khalil Allah and his followers were hiding their true faith.

He was succeeded by his son, Nur al-Dahr Ali.

References

Sources

 

16th-century births
1634 deaths
Nizari imams
16th-century Iranian people
17th-century Iranian people
Iranian Ismailis
16th-century Ismailis
17th-century Ismailis
16th-century Islamic religious leaders
17th-century Islamic religious leaders
16th-century people of Safavid Iran
17th-century people of Safavid Iran
People from Markazi Province